The 2017 Dallas Cowboys season was the franchise's 58th season in the National Football League (NFL), the ninth playing their home games at AT&T Stadium and the seventh full season under head coach Jason Garrett. It was also the 29th season under owner Jerry Jones. For the first time since 2002, quarterback Tony Romo was not on the opening day roster, as he announced his retirement on April 4, 2017. The Cowboys failed to improve or match upon their 13–3 record from the previous season. In Week 16 via a loss at home to the Seattle Seahawks, they were eliminated from playoff contention and missed the playoffs for the sixth time in the last eight seasons.

Offseason

Signings

(†) - Later released
(††) - Later retired

Departures

Draft

Notes
 The Cowboys traded their original fifth-round (No. 171 overall) selection to the Buffalo Bills in exchange for a seventh-round (No. 228 overall) selection and quarterback Matt Cassell.
 The Cowboys traded their 2018 fifth-round selection to the New York Jets in exchange for a 2017 sixth-round (No. 191 overall) selection.
The Cowboys traded their original sixth-round (No. 211 overall) selection to the New England Patriots in exchange for sixth (No. 216 overall) and seventh-round (No. 239 overall) selections.

Staff

Rosters

Opening preseason roster

Week one roster

Final roster

Preseason

Regular season

Schedule

Note: Intra-division opponents are in bold text.

Game summaries

Week 1: vs. New York Giants

Dallas opened its third straight season at home against NFC East division rival New York. Giants wide receiver Odell Beckham Jr. sat out the game still nursing a preseason injury. Dallas' solid and workmanlike performance was punctuated early in the fourth quarter when Cole Beasley made a spectacular one-handed circus catch for a key first down. Dallas tight end Jason Witten surpassed Michael Irvin as the all-time receiving-yards leader in franchise history and also scored the lone touchdown of the game on a second-quarter 12-yard pass from quarterback Dak Prescott, who had some passes sail high early but settled down to turn in another solid and turnover-free performance. The Dallas win snapped its three-game losing streak against New York.

Week 2: at Denver Broncos

In a stunning reversal of the previous week's performance, the Dallas Cowboys struggled in almost every aspect of the game, getting blown out by an inspired Denver Broncos team in Denver. The Broncos defense stuffed the Dallas run game and pressured quarterback Dak Prescott, who threw two interceptions – one returned late in the game for a pick-six. Defensively Dallas had no answers for the Broncos attack, plagued with poor tackling and bad pursuit angles, giving up yards after pass catches and rushing yards in chunks. Dallas fell to 1–1, looking to be in total disarray – nursing several key injuries to its secondary – heading into its Monday night meeting at Arizona against the Cardinals.

Week 3: at Arizona Cardinals

After a precarious start which saw Arizona take its opening possession straight down the field for a touchdown, and then Dallas following up with a prompt three-and-out, the Dallas Cowboys adjusted their defensive schemes and got their running game going and slowly but surely overcame the Cardinals on Monday Night Football.

Despite Carson Palmer's 325 yards passing, Dallas was able to limit scoring damage with key pressures and sacks, and run stoppages to keep the Cardinals neutralized. Dak Prescott turned in a turnover-free performance for the Cowboys with 183 yards passing and two touchdown tosses, while running for Dallas' first score – a second quarter 10-yard scamper on a read-option play. Ezekiel Elliott rebounded from last week's dismal performance to accumulate 80 yards on 22 carries and scored one touchdown. Dallas found itself with a 2–1 record heading into a short week to prepare for the visiting Los Angeles Rams October 1.

Week 4: vs. Los Angeles Rams

The "tale of two halves" sports cliché was never more true to life as it was Sunday October 1 in AT&T Stadium, as the Dallas Cowboys lost to the visiting Los Angeles Rams 35–30 after dominating the first half of play.

Dallas was in the driver's seat and looked ready to demolish the young Rams and their rookie head coach after a workmanlike, dominating first half that saw Dallas post three touchdowns after long-distance drives and hold a 24–16 halftime lead.

The second half saw Dallas' offense virtually grind to a halt while Los Angeles slowly chipped away at the lead, finally finding themselves ahead to stay after Todd Gurley's 53-yard catch-and-run put Los Angeles up 26–24 late in the third quarter. After Dallas posted a 4th-quarter touchdown on a pass to tight end James Hanna, Los Angeles was able to answer with its 7th field goal of the game. With the score 35–30, a late Dallas rally failed, and the Cowboys found themselves 2–2 with a looming meeting at home versus the Green Bay Packers October 8.

Week 5: vs. Green Bay Packers

With Dallas posting a 21–12 halftime lead, they looked in prime form for revenge in this rematch of their Divisional round playoff the previous season. Green Bay kept chipping away and Aaron Rodgers led the Packers on a late nine-play 75-yard scoring drive that culminated in a 12-yard touchdown pass to Davante Adams with 11 seconds remaining in the game. Damarious Randall earlier added a pick-six to the scoring with a 21-yard return of a Dak Prescott interception to give Green Bay a 28–24 lead at 9:56 of the fourth quarter. Dallas had answered that, regaining the lead on an 11-yard Dak Prescott touchdown run after a grueling 17-play, eight-minute 79-yard scoring drive which left 1:13 on the game clock for Green Bay to work with. Dallas dropped to 2–3 with the loss, heading into its bye week, while Green Bay improved to 4–1 moving forward with a visit against division rival Minnesota Vikings October 15.

Week 7: at San Francisco 49ers

Bouncing back from a two-game losing streak, Dallas dominated a winless San Francisco 49ers team 40–10. Ezekiel Elliott led the attack with 147 rushing yards and three touchdowns on 26 carries, with 219 total yards from scrimmage. Quarterback Dak Prescott completed 64 percent of his passes for 234 yards and three touchdowns with no interceptions and wasn't sacked, completing passes to eight different receivers and finishing with a 134.0 passer rating. The Dallas offense racked up 501 total yards with Dez Bryant posting 74 receiving yards on a game-leading 7 catches and scored one touchdown. The defense dominated throughout, with constant pressure on the quarterback including five sacks and aggressive pass coverage and run defense which held the 49ers to only 103 rushing yards. Dallas improved to 3–3 with the victory and a looming division match-up at Washington October 29.

Week 8: at Washington Redskins

On a windy, chilly, rainy Sunday afternoon at FedEx Field in Washington, Dallas earned its second consecutive road victory with a somewhat sloppy and penalty-ridden 33–19 result over NFC East rival Washington. Ezekiel Elliott carried the ball a career-high 31 times for 150 rushing yards and two touchdowns, to lead Dallas' 307 yards of total offense.

Dallas' defense limited the Redskins to only 49 yards rushing and 285 yards of total offense while recording 4 sacks for minus 27 yards, recovering two fumbles and grabbing one interception by cornerback Byron Jones – Dallas' first interception since week two versus Denver. On special teams, Dallas recovered a fumbled kickoff and Cowboys cornerback Orlando Scandrick returned a blocked field goal attempt 86 yards to the Washington 2-yard line, setting up an Ezekiel Elliott rushing touchdown, which put Dallas ahead 14–13 with 2:20 left to play in the first half.

Dallas improved its record to 4–3 and captured sole possession of second place in the NFC East, with a looming visit from the Kansas City Chiefs at AT&T Stadium November 5.

Week 9: vs. Kansas City Chiefs

With Ezekiel Elliott playing on a last-minute stay of his looming suspension and carrying the ball 27 times for 93 yards and one touchdown, and Dak Prescott throwing two touchdown passes to Cole Beasley, running for another score and finding receiver Terrance Williams nine times for a game high 141 yards, the Cowboys notched their third straight victory by a score of 28–17 and improved their record to 5–3 at AT&T Stadium against the AFC West division leading Kansas City Chiefs.

Two long touchdown drives in the second half lifted Dallas to the win after Kansas City had taken command on an unexpected 56-yard Tyreek Hill touchdown catch and run with no time left on the 2nd quarter game clock, then Kansas City following that up with a Travis Kelce 2-yard touchdown grab from Alex Smith at 9:11 of the third quarter to take its first lead of the game, 17–14. Dallas' two long touchdown drives were 12 and 13 plays respectively, eating up over 12 minutes of second-half game clock.

This was also Tony Romo's first return to AT&T Stadium, this time, as an announcer. Romo played for the Dallas Cowboys form 2003 to 2016.

Week 10: at Atlanta Falcons

Already without Ezekiel Elliott, whose suspension had finally taken effect, the Cowboys lost key players Tyron Smith and Sean Lee to injuries. Dak Prescott had a miserable day, being sacked an astounding eight times. Six of those sacks came from an unknown Adrian Clayborn, who set the Falcons record for most sacks in one game. The Cowboys lost the game 27–7, dropping to 5–4.

Week 11: vs. Philadelphia Eagles

The game immediately began with Ryan Switzer running a kickoff for 61 yards to Eagles' territory. The Cowboys would open the scoring with a field goal from Mike Nugent, who was filling in for injured Dan Bailey. The Cowboys closed the half leading 9–7. Afterwards, the Cowboys would allow 30 unanswered points to make the game 37–9. Dak Prescott was harassed all game by the Eagles' defense, losing a fumble and getting intercepted three times. This loss dropped them to 5–5 on the season and 0–2 without Elliott. The 28-point loss margin is the worst at AT&T Stadium and would not be matched until 2020, where they lost to the Arizona Cardinals 38–10.

Week 12: vs. Los Angeles Chargers
NFL on Thanksgiving Day

The Chargers dominated the Cowboys all game and only surrendered 6 points. With the loss, the Cowboys dropped to 5–6 on the season and 0–3 without Elliott. This would be their last loss without Elliott, as the Cowboys turned things around the next week.

Week 13: vs. Washington Redskins

The Cowboys led the entire game. The biggest highlight was an 83-yard punt return by Ryan Switzer. With the win, they snapped a 3-game losing streak and improved to 1-3 without Elliott.

Week 14: at New York Giants

For the first time in franchise history, the Cowboys wore white pants and navy jerseys. The jerseys are usually paired with silver pants. The white pants were the Color Rush pants with a navy/silver/navy stripe down the side, and the navy jersey is the regular alternate navy jersey, usually worn on Thanksgiving.

The Cowboys defeated the Giants 30-10 and improve to 7-6 and 2-3 without Elliott. They also swept the Giants for the first time since 2014.

Week 15: at Oakland Raiders
{{Americanfootballbox
|titlestyle=;text-align:center;
|state=autocollapse
|title=Week Fifteen: Dallas Cowboys at Oakland Raiders – Game summary
|date=December 17
|time=7:30 p.m. CST/5:30 p.m. PST
|road=Cowboys
|R1=3|R2=7|R3=7|R4=3
|home=Raiders
|H1=0|H2=0|H3=10|H4=7
|stadium=Oakland Alameda Coliseum, Oakland, California
|attendance=55,372
|weather=, clear
|referee=Gene Steratore
|TV=NBC
|TVAnnouncers=Al Michaels, Cris Collinsworth and Michele Tafoya
|reference=Recap, Gamebook
|scoring=
First quarter
DAL – Dan Bailey 45-yard field goal, 4:56. Cowboys 3–0. Drive: 9 plays, 41 yards, 4:08.
Second quarter
DAL – Rod Smith 1-yard run (Dan Bailey kick), 14:04. Cowboys 10–0. Drive: 8 plyas, 65 yards, 4:45.
Third quarter
OAK – Michael Crabtree 2-yard pass from Derek Carr (Giorgio Tavecchio kick), 8:03. Cowboys 10–7. Drive: 11 plays, 90 yards. 6:57.
OAK – Giorgio Tavecchio 39-yard field goal, 6:14. Tie 10–10. Drive: 4 plays, 1 yard, 1:00.
DAL – Dak Prescott 5-yard run (Dan Bailey kick), 0:45. Cowboys 17–10. Drive 11 plays, 75 yards, 5:29.Fourth quarterOAK – Michael Crabtree 2-yard pass from Derek Carr (Giorgio Tavecchio kick), 10:35. Tie 17–17. Drive: 10 plays, 53 yards, 5:10.
DAL – Dan Bailey 19-yard field goal, 1:44. Cowboys 20–17. Drive: 11 plays 69 yards, 4:46.
|stats=Top passers DAL – Dak Prescott 18/27, 212 yards, 2 INT
 OAK – Derek Carr 21/38, 171 yards, 2 TDTop rushers DAL – Alfred Morris 16 rushes, 61 yards
 OAK – Marshawn Lynch 16 rushes 76 yardsTop receivers DAL – Dez Bryant 2 receptions, 59 yards
 OAK – Seth Roberts 3 receptions, 52 yardsTop tacklers'''
 DAL – Sean Lee 10 tackles
 OAK – NaVorro Bowman 9 tackles
}}

The game was close all the way. The game was clinched when Derek Carr fumbled the ball out of the end zone with less than a minute left in the game, allowing the Cowboys to improve to 8–6 on the season and finish the last game without Elliott at 3–3. Elliott returned the next week.

Week 16: vs. Seattle Seahawks

Elliott returned from his six-game suspension. However, the Cowboys were eliminated from playoff contention with this loss.

Week 17: at Philadelphia Eagles

The Cowboys won an monotonous game versus the Eagles 6-0, with the only score coming on a late touchdown by Brice Butler. With the narrow win, the Cowboys finished a difficult season with a 9–7 record. Despite this, it was the first time they had recorded back-to-back winning seasons since the 2008 and 2009 seasons. They also recorded their first shutout since the 2009 season which was, coincidentally, also during a Week 17 game against the Eagles. This was Dez Bryant's last game with Dallas, as the Cowboys released him on April 13, 2018. This was Jason Witten's last game in the NFL until Week 1 of the 2019 season, as he retired on May 3, 2018 and joined the Monday Night Football'' booth. He later came out of retirement and rejoined the Cowboys in 2019. It would also be the final game in a Cowboys uniform for kicker Dan Bailey, who missed the extra point on Butler's touchdown, as well as a late field goal attempt. Bailey was released on September 1, 2018 and signed with the Minnesota Vikings on September 17, 2018.

Standings

Division

Conference

References

External links
 
 

Dallas
Dallas Cowboys seasons
Dallas Cowboys
2010s in Dallas
2017 in Texas